Xia Jiangbo (born September 1, 1989) is a Chinese swimmer. At the 2012 Summer Paralympics she won 2 gold medals.

References

External links 
 

1989 births
Living people
Chinese female breaststroke swimmers
Paralympic swimmers of China
Paralympic gold medalists for China
Paralympic bronze medalists for China
Swimmers at the 2012 Summer Paralympics
Medalists at the 2012 Summer Paralympics
Medalists at the 2008 Summer Paralympics
World record holders in paralympic swimming
Paralympic medalists in swimming
Chinese female freestyle swimmers
Chinese female backstroke swimmers
S3-classified Paralympic swimmers
21st-century Chinese women